Chattogram Metropolitan Police (CMP), former Chittagong Metropolitan Police, is the chief law enforcement agency in Chattogram, the second largest city in Bangladesh. It was established in 1978 under the Chittagong Metropolitan Police Ordinance approved by the Government of Bangladesh.

History 
Chattogram Metropolitan Police was established on 30 November 1978 with M. M. Sharif Ali as its first commissioner. It has six police stations at the beginning with 3238 personnel.

On 24 January 1988, Chittagong Metropolitan Police Commissioner Mirza Rakibul Huda ordered police to fire at a rally of Awami League killing 24 people. It is known as the 1988 Chittagong massacre.

Mobassher, a member of Bangladesh Ansar, stationed in Chandgaon Police Station, was arrested for the rape of a 7-year-old girl on May 2012.

In May 2016, the Chattogram Metropolitan Police banned people from putting stickers in their car mentioning their professions.

Commissioner Mahbubur Rahman of Chattogram Metropolitan Police told the media on 5 September 2018 that extrajudicial killings of drug dealers are necessary for peace. From May to September, 10 drug dealers were killed by the police under his command. In November, the Chattogram Metropolitan Police began their first counter terrorism unit.

In June 2020, Chattogram Metropolitan Police established the 100 bed CMP-Bidyanondo Field Hospital in collaboration with Bidyanondo Foundation. During the COVID-19 pandemic in Bangladesh Kotwali police station under the Chattogram Metropolitan Police started providing home delivery of medicine. In August 2020, eight members of Chattogram Metropolitan Police were sued for allegedly implicating four people in a narcotics case in an attempt to extort money. The complaint was filed with Additional Metropolitan Magistrate Mohiuddin Murad.

Two police constables of the Chattogram Metropolitan Police disappeared while on training in the Netherlands in May 2022. They had decided to stay in the country and deserted. In August, three constables were withdrawn after video of them confining and torturing children went viral.

List of police stations under CMP 

There are currently 16 police stations operating under CMP.

Akbar Shah Police Station
Bayazid Bostami Police Station
Chawk Bazar Police Station
Kotwali Police Station
Bakolia Police Station
Sadarghat Police Station
Doublemooring Police Station
Khulshi Police Station
Panchlaish Police Station
Chandgaon Police Station
Halishahar Police Station
Pahartali Police Station
Bandar Police Station
EPZ Police Station
Patenga Police Station
Karnophuli Police Station

Police Commissioners

References 

Government of Chittagong
Municipal law enforcement agencies of Bangladesh